Jansyerik Maratkhan (born 4 April 1999) is a Mongolian footballer who plays as an attacking midfielder for Mongolian Premier League club SP Falcons and the Mongolian national team.

Club career
Jansyerik played for Deren FC from 2008 to 2019. Prior the 2020 Mongolian Premier League season, he joined SP Falcons. He made his debut for the club in the opening match of the season, a 1–0 victory over his former club, Deren.

International career
On 8 November 2017 Jansyerik scored a hattrick against Singapore in a 4–2 victory in 2018 AFC U-19 Championship qualification. He made his senior international debut on 2 September 2018 in a 2019 EAFF E-1 Football Championship match against Macau.

International goals
Score and result list Mongolia's goal tally first.

International career statistics

Personal
Jansyerik was born in Bayan-Ölgii Province. He is an ethnic Kazakh.

References

External links
National Football Teams profile
Soccerway profile

1999 births
Living people
Mongolian footballers
Association football midfielders
Association football forwards
Mongolia international footballers